Lieutenant Colonel Alexander Fyodorovich Volchkov (Russian: Алекса́ндр Фёдорович Волчко́в; August 10, 1902 – 1978) was a judge during the Nuremberg trials after World War II. He was the alternate Soviet judge during the proceedings. Before taking up the practice of law he had worked in the film business.

References 

1902 births
1978 deaths
20th-century judges
20th-century jurists
People from Sergachsky Uyezd
Recipients of the Order of the Red Banner of Labour
Recipients of the Order of the Red Star
Judges of the International Military Tribunal in Nuremberg
Russian judges
Russian jurists
Soviet colonels
Soviet judges of international courts and tribunals
Soviet jurists